Gina Fiandaca is an American government official who was appointed to serve as secretary of the Massachusetts Department of Transportation in January 2023.

Early life and education 
Fiandaca was born and raised in East Boston, Massachusetts. She earned a Bachelor of Science degree in business administration from Suffolk University and a Master of Business Administration from Boston University.

Career 
From 2006 to 2014, Fiandaca served as director of Boston's Office of the Parking Clerk. From 2015 to 2019, she served as commissioner of the Boston Department of Transportation. In 2019, she became assistant city manager of Austin, Texas. She was appointed by governor Maura Healey to serve as secretary of the Massachusetts Department of Transportation in January 2023.

Personal life 

Fiandaca's sister, Cheryl Fiandaca, was married to William Bratton.

References 

Living people
People from East Boston, Boston
Suffolk University alumni
Boston University alumni
Massachusetts Secretaries of Transportation
Year of birth missing (living people)